Indian Cove is a local service district and designated place in the Canadian province of Newfoundland and Labrador. It is just off Route 340 on New World Island. It is the last community before crossing the causeway to Twillingate. Before the construction of the causeway, there was a ferry that ran from Indian Cove to Twillingate. There is a hair salon and dog grooming services. Education is provided by New World Island Academy in Summerford and grocery shopping can be done in nearby Twillingate.

Geography 
Indian Cove is in Newfoundland within Subdivision H of Division No. 8.

Demographics 

Government 
Indian Cove is a local service district (LSD) that is governed by a committee responsible for the provision of certain services to the community. The chair of the LSD committee is Sheldon Hollett.

See also 
List of communities in Newfoundland and Labrador
List of designated places in Newfoundland and Labrador
List of local service districts in Newfoundland and Labrador

References 

Populated coastal places in Canada
Designated places in Newfoundland and Labrador
Local service districts in Newfoundland and Labrador